Commitment to Mexico (Spanish: Compromiso por México) was an electoral alliance between the Institutional Revolutionary Party and the Green Ecologist Party for the 2012 Mexican general election. The alliance supported Enrique Peña Nieto in his successful campaign for the 2012 Mexican general election.

Likewise, the alliance was replicated in the candidacies for senators by some states and federal deputies in various electoral districts throughout the country.

Although the New Alliance Party belonged to the coalition, on 20 January 2012 with a directive that political institute decided to compete separately.

Presidential elections

References 

2011 establishments in Mexico
2015 disestablishments in Mexico
Political organizations based in Mexico
Defunct political party alliances in Mexico